This is the discography of American gospel artist Kirk Franklin. In total, Franklin has won fifteen Grammy Awards, thirteen Dove Awards and twenty-eight Stellar Awards.

Albums

Studio albums

Christmas albums

Compilation albums

Live albums

Singles

As a lead artist

A

Collaborations

As a featured guest

Other charted songs

Music videos
"Why We Sing"
"Melodies From Heaven" 
"Stomp" (featuring Cheryl "Salt" James of Salt-N-Pepa)
"You Are The Only One"
"Lean On Me"
"Revolution"
"Thank You" (with Mary Mary)
"Nobody"
"Brighter Day"
"Looking for You"
"Imagine Me"
"September" from Interpretations: The Music of Earth, Wind, & Fire
"Let It Go"
"Declaration (This is It)"
"Are You Listening?"
"I Smile"
"Wanna Be Happy?"
"Love Theory"
"OK"

Other appearances

Videography

DVD/Video releases

References

Discographies of American artists
Christian music discographies
Pop music discographies